Stjepan Gabriel Meštrović (born 1955) is an American sociologist. He is professor of sociology at Texas A&M University. Meštrović has served as an expert witness in war crimes trials, including at the Abu Ghraib torture and prisoner abuse case. He has written over 15 books. 

Meštrović was born in Croatia and moved to the United States when he was 8 years old. He holds three degrees from Harvard University and a Ph.D. degree from Syracuse University. He began teaching at A&M University in 1991. He is a grandson of the Croatian sculptor Ivan Meštrović.

Selected works
Durkheim and Postmodern Culture (Routledge, 1992). 
Emile Durkheim and the Reformation of Sociology (Rowman & Littlefield, 1993). 
Genocide after Emotion: The Post-Emotional Balkan War (Routledge, 1996). 
This Time We Knew: Western Responses to Genocide in Bosnia, co-edited with Thomas Cushman (NYU Press, 1996). 
Postemotional Society (SAGE, 1997). 
Anthony Giddens: The Last Modernist (Taylor & Francis, 1998). 
Trials of Abu Ghraib: An Expert Witness Account of Shame and Honor (Routledge, 2006). 
The Good Soldier on Trial: A Sociological Study of Misconduct by the Us Military Pertaining to Operation Iron Triangle, Iraq (Algora Publishing, 2009). 
Strike and Destroy: When Counter-insurgency (COIN) Doctrine Met Hellraisers Brigade Or, the Fate of Corporal Morlock (Algora Publishing, 2012). 
The Postemotional Bully (SAGE, 2015).

See also
Yugoslav Wars
Texas A&M University
Ivan Meštrović

References

Living people
1955 births
American sociologists
Texas A&M University faculty
Harvard University alumni
Syracuse University alumni
Croatian emigrants to the United States